The following are some of the books and papers which have been written concerning William Howard Taft, the 27th president of the United States:

General sources

Burns, Adam D. "Adapting to Empire: William H. Taft, Theodore Roosevelt, and the Philippines, 1900-08," Comparative American Studies 11 (Dec. 2013), 418-33.
Burns, Adam D. "Retentionist in Chief: William Howard Taft and the Question of Philippine Independence, 1912-1916." Philippine Studies: Historical and Ethnographic Viewpoints 61#2 (2013): 163-192. online
Burton, David Henry. William Howard Taft: Confident Peacemaker (St. Joseph's University Press, 2004).
Burton, David H. "The Learned Presidency: Roosevelt, Taft, Wilson." Presidential Studies Quarterly 15#3 (1985): 486-497.

 Crowe, Justin. "The forging of judicial autonomy: Political entrepreneurship and the reforms of William Howard Taft." Journal of Politics 69.1 (2007): 73-87. online

Escalante, Rene R. The Bearer of Pax Americana: The Philippine Career of William H. Taft, 1900-1903 (New Day Publishers, 2007).

 Lurie, Jonathan. William Howard Taft: The travails of a progressive conservative (Cambridge University Press, 2011).

 Milkis, Sidney M. "William Howard Taft and the Struggle for the Soul of the Constitution." Toward an American Conservatism (Palgrave Macmillan, 2013) pp. 63-93.

Morrisey, Will. The Dilemma of Progressivism: How Roosevelt, Taft, and Wilson Reshaped the American Regime of Self-government (Rowman & Littlefield Publishers, 2009).
 Noyes, John E. "William Howard Taft and the Taft Arbitration Treaties." Villanova Law Review 56 (2011): 535+.  online
 Rooney, William H., and Timothy G. Fleming. "William Howard Taft, the Origin of the Rule of Reason, and the Actavis Challenge." Columbia Business Law review  (2018): 1+.  online

Primary sources

, military aide to Taft
 Republican campaign text-book 1912 (1912) online 

Taft, William Howard

Taft
Taft
William Howard Taft-related lists